The Raritan–Readington South Branch Historic District is a  historic district along River Road from New Jersey Route 31 to U.S. Route 202 near Flemington in Hunterdon County, New Jersey. It is primarily on the western side of the South Branch Raritan River in Raritan Township. It extends onto the eastern side of the river in Readington Township. County Route 523 and County Route 612 pass through the district to the north. The district encompasses the small settlements of Holcomb Mills, Flemington Junction, and Rockefellows Mills. It was added to the National Register of Historic Places on January 26, 1990, for its significance in architecture, politics, transportation, and exploration/settlement. The district includes 36 contributing buildings, four contributing structures, and three contributing sites. It also includes the John Reading Farmstead, previously listed on the NRHP individually.

History
The John Reading Farmstead was built in 1760 for John Reading, former governor of the Province of New Jersey, 1757–1758.

The Flemington Junction station was built  by the Lehigh Valley Railroad.

The one-lane Rockafellows Mill Bridge crossing the South Branch Raritan River was built in 1900 by the Wrought Iron Bridge Company of Canton, Ohio.

Gallery

References

External links
 
 

Raritan Township, New Jersey
Readington Township, New Jersey
National Register of Historic Places in Hunterdon County, New Jersey
Historic districts on the National Register of Historic Places in New Jersey
New Jersey Register of Historic Places
Pre-statehood history of New Jersey